Government House, Rangoon was the official residence (Government House) of the colonial governors of Burma.  

The building was built in the Queen Anne Revival style.

The formal handover of power from colonial authorities to the newly formed government of Burma was commemorated at the lawn of the Government House on 4 January 1948. In the following years, it served as the de facto residence for Burmese presidents, including Sao Shwe Thaik, Ba Oo, and Mahn Win Maung.

The building was demolished in 1985 on the orders of Ne Win following earthquake damage in the 1970s. A complex housing the national-level People's Assembly was built on the former site of the Government House; it is now home to the Yangon Region Hluttaw.

Gallery

See also
 Presidential Palace, Naypyidaw
 Government Houses of the British Empire and Commonwealth
 Belmond Governor's Residence

References

External links

Buildings and structures in Yangon
Government Houses of the British Empire and Commonwealth
Government buildings in Myanmar
Houses completed in 1895
Demolished buildings and structures in Myanmar
Buildings and structures demolished in 1985